Eucharist here refers to Holy Communion or the Body and Blood of Christ, which is consumed during the Catholic Mass or Eucharistic Celebration. "At the Last Supper, on the night he was betrayed, our Savior instituted the Eucharistic sacrifice of his Body and Blood, … a memorial of his death and resurrection: a sacrament of love, a sign of unity, a bond of charity, a Paschal banquet 'in which Christ is consumed, the mind is filled with grace, and a pledge of future glory is given to us. As such, Eucharist is "an action of thanksgiving to God" derived from "the Jewish blessings that proclaim – especially during a meal – God's works: creation, redemption, and sanctification."

Blessed Sacrament is a devotional term used in the Catholic Church to refer to the Eucharistic species (consecrated sacramental bread and wine) . Consecrated hosts are kept in a tabernacle after Mass, so that the Blessed Sacrament can be brought to the sick and dying outside the time of Mass. This makes possible also the practice of eucharistic adoration. Because Christ himself is present in the sacrament of the altar, he is to be honored with the worship of adoration. "To visit the Blessed Sacrament is ... a proof of gratitude, an expression of love,… and a display of adoration toward Christ our Lord."

History

The historical roots of Catholic eucharistic theology begin with the same sources as do other Christian churches who express their faith in the "bread of life" found in the words of Jesus in Scripture. These include the Hebrew and Christian scriptures, the Church Fathers, and later Christian writers. While the word "Eucharist" (from the Greek) refers to Christ's prolongation of the Jewish Passover or "thanksgiving" meal, the gift of Communion, whereby, as Paul says, he fashions us into one body in him, came to signify God's greatest gift, for which Christians are most thankful.

Institution

The three synoptic Gospels and Paul's First Letter to the Corinthians contain versions of the Words of Institution: "Take, eat, this is my body…. Take, drink, this is my blood…. Do this in remembrance of me."  All subsequent reference to the Communion bread and wine in the Eucharist is based on this injunction. A more detailed explanation of the Communion bread is the New Testament passage John 6:47-67, key to understanding of the disciples of Jesus and the first Christians. There Jesus states: 
I am the living bread which came down from heaven. If any man eat of this bread, he shall live for ever; and the bread that I will give, is my flesh, for the life of the world. The Jews therefore strove among themselves, saying: How can this man give us his flesh to eat? Then Jesus said to them: Amen, amen I say unto you: Except you eat the flesh of the Son of man, and drink his blood, you shall not have life in you. Whoever eats my flesh and drinks my blood has eternal life, and I will raise him on the last day. For my flesh is true food, and my blood is true drink. (51-55)
Jesus then points to the need for correspondence between the bread as a sign (sacrament) and the life of those who would profit from it:
Those who eat my flesh and drink my blood abide in me and I in them. Just as the living Father sent me and I live because of the Father, so whoever eats me will live because of me.... It is the spirit that gives life, the flesh is profits nothing. (56f; 63)

Old Testament Foundations of the Eucharist

The New Testament tells of Jesus' celebration of the Jewish passover meal with his disciples before he died (though according to John's Gospel this meal would have been anticipated by Jesus – 19:14). At this meal the Jewish people recounted God's blessings toward them over each of the dishes. Jesus would turn one of the blessings over the bread and over the wine into symbols of the Father's love in his own life, death, and resurrection, and tell his disciples to do this in memory of him. As a thanksgiving meal, the Passover meal can be likened to the todah or thanksgiving sacrifice. As a collective todah of Israel under the Mosaic covenant, it was the highest instance of todah sacrifice in the Hebrew Scripture. Likewise, the very term "Eucharist" (from the Greek eucharistia) reflects the centrality of thanksgiving. Christ's words of institution emphasize the essential todah elements of thanksgiving and remembrance, whose object in this case is his "body which is given for you". As suggested by Jesus' use of Psalm 22 (Mk 15:34), a classic todah psalm, Christ's Passion, death, and resurrection exemplify the characteristic todah movement from lament to praise.

Just as Passover recalled and made present the Exodus from bondage in Egypt, the New Passover recalls and makes present the New Exodus from bondage to sin. The New Exodus, in which the twelve tribes of Israel would be redeemed along with the nations, was a major theme of the Old Testament prophets. In Isaiah 40-55 and the New Testament 1 Peter 1:18-19, the New Exodus is closely associated with redemption from sin.

As given in the Gospels of Mark and Matthew, the words Jesus spoke over the cup begin, "this is my blood of the covenant". This phrase echoes the establishment of the Mosaic covenant in Ex 24:8, referring to the blood that is used to seal a covenant poured out to initiate the covenant. Thus, Jesus declares at the Last Supper that his own blood, poured out in his Passion and made really present in the Eucharist, reestablishes the bond of kinship between God and man. The Last Supper and Passion established the covenant, and the Eucharist is now an ongoing re-presentation of that covenantal establishment.

Jesus describes his blood as "poured out for many for the forgiveness of sins". These words allude to the prophetic theme of the "many" among the exiled tribes of Israel to be redeemed in the New Exodus Is 52:12 from and with the Gentiles Zech 10:8-11. The likeness between the Jewish people as God's suffering servant and the unexpected suffering Messiah is evident in these passages which speak of a paschal lamb whose life is "poured out" for the "sin of many"

Paul's epistle to the Corinthians

The Scriptures contain testimony from the early Christians. In 1 Cor, Paul states: "The cup of blessing that we bless, is it not a participation in the blood of Christ? The bread that we break, is it not a participation in the body of Christ? Because the loaf of bread is one, we, though many, are one body, for we all partake of the one loaf." In the next chapter, he draws the association we find in the Didache and elsewhere, the need for purity in receiving the Eucharist. First, Paul narrates the meal when Jesus "after he had given thanks, broke it and said, 'This is my body that is for you. Do this in remembrance of me. Likewise with the chalice, and Paul concludes: "As often as you eat this bread and drink the cup, you proclaim the death of the Lord until he comes. Therefore whoever eats the bread or drinks the cup of the Lord unworthily will have to answer for the body and blood of the Lord. A person should examine himself, and so eat the bread and drink the cup. For anyone who eats and drinks without discerning the body, eats and drinks judgment on himself." The early letters and documents seem to affirm a belief in what would later be called the Real Presence of Jesus in the Communion bread and wine.

Early Christian documents

Didache
From the earliest Christian documents, such as the Didache, the understanding follows this pattern: that the bread and wine that is blessed and consumed at the end of the (transformed) Passover meal had a more real connection with Christ than would a less "real" sign. The Didache emphasizes the importance of a proper disposition if this sign is to have its effect, and involve a true, personal sacrifice: "confessing your transgressions so that your sacrifice may be pure". Only the baptized were permitted to receive the Eucharist, "But let no one eat or drink of your Thanksgiving (Eucharist), but they who have been baptized into the name of the Lord" (Ch. 9).

Ignatius of Antioch
St. Ignatius of Antioch, who was martyred in c. 107, speaks of his disposition and gives spiritual meaning to the blood: "I have no taste for corruptible food nor for the pleasures of this life. I desire the Bread of God, which is the Flesh of Jesus Christ, who was of the seed of David; and for drink I desire His Blood, which is love incorruptible". He recommended Christians to stay aloof from heretics who "confess not the Eucharist to be the flesh of our Saviour Jesus Christ, which suffered for our sins, and which the Father, of His goodness, raised up again". (Note the use of "which", referring to "the flesh", not "who", which would refer to "our Saviour Jesus Christ".)

Justin Martyr
St. Justin Martyr, c. 150: "We call this food Eucharist; and no one else is permitted to partake of it, except one who believes our teaching to be true.... For not as common bread nor common drink do we receive these; but since Jesus Christ our Savior was made incarnate by the word of God and had both flesh and blood for our salvation, so too, as we have been taught, the food which has been made into the Eucharist by the Eucharistic prayer set down by Him, and by the change of which our blood and flesh is nourished, is both the flesh and the blood of that incarnated Jesus".

Irenaeus of Lyons
Irenaeus, c. 180: "When, therefore, the mingled cup and the manufactured bread receives the Word of God, and the Eucharist of the blood and the body of Christ is made, from which things the substance of our flesh is increased and supported, how can they affirm that the flesh is incapable of receiving the gift of God, which is life eternal, which [flesh] is nourished from the body and blood of the Lord, and is a member of Him?...and having received the Word of God, becomes the Eucharist, which is the body and blood of Christ".

Clement of Alexandria
From St. Clement of Alexandria, c. 202: Eat My Flesh.' He says, 'and drink My Blood.' The Lord supplies us with these intimate nutriments. He delivers over His Flesh, and pours out His Blood; and nothing is lacking for the growth of His children. O incredible mystery!" The Catholic church will not be overly literal in her interpretation of these statements, but would teach that Jesus is present whole and entire under both species. An overly physical interpretation of what is being received would overlook the spiritual meaning and effect that gives purpose to this sign, and the disposition that makes any spiritual effect possible.

Apostolic Tradition
The church liturgy described in Apostolic Tradition emphasizes the reverence given to the Eucharist: "The faithful shall be careful to partake of the eucharist before eating anything else. For if they eat with faith, even though some deadly poison is given to them, after this it will not be able to harm them. All shall be careful so that no unbeliever tastes of the eucharist, nor a mouse or other animal, nor that any of it falls and is lost. For it is the Body of Christ, to be eaten by those who believe, and not to be scorned." (Ch. 36-37)

Cyprian of Carthage
Cyprian's Treatise On The Lord's Prayer, c. 250, identifies the Eucharist with the daily bread mentioned in The Lord's Prayer: "And we ask that this bread should be given to us daily, that we who are in Christ, and daily receive the Eucharist for the food of salvation, may not, by the interposition of some heinous sin, by being prevented, as withheld and not communicating, from partaking of the heavenly bread, be separated from Christ's body" (Par. 18).

The Council of Nicaea
Canon 18 of the First Council of Nicaea clarified that only bishops and presbyters could administer the Eucharist: "It has come to the knowledge of the holy and great Synod that, in some districts and cities, the deacons administer the Eucharist to the presbyters, whereas neither canon nor custom permits that they who have no right to offer should give the Body of Christ to them that do offer. And this also has been made known, that certain deacons now touch the Eucharist even before the bishops. Let all such practices be utterly done away, and let the deacons remain within their own bounds, knowing that they are the ministers of the bishop and the inferiors of the presbyters. Let them receive the Eucharist according to their order, after the presbyters, and let either the bishop or the presbyter administer to them."

Over the centuries

Christian documents show that this doctrine of how we regard the host was maintained. From Origen, c. 244: "[W]hen you have received the Body of the Lord, you reverently exercise every care lest a particle of it fall..." From St. Ephraim, ante 373: "Do not now regard as bread that which I have given you; but take, eat this Bread, and do not scatter the crumbs; for what I have called My Body, that it is indeed". From St. Augustine, c. 412: "He walked here in the same flesh, and gave us the same flesh to be eaten unto salvation. But no one eats that flesh unless first he adores it; and thus it is discovered how such a footstool of the Lord's feet is adored; and not only do we not sin by adoring, we do sin by not adoring". 

Paschasius Radbertus (785–865) was a Carolingian theologian, and the abbot of Corbie, whose most well-known and influential work is an exposition on the nature of the Eucharist written around 831, entitled De Corpore et Sanguine Domini. In it, Paschasius agrees with Ambrose in affirming that the Eucharist contains the true, historical body of Jesus Christ. According to Paschasius, God is truth itself, and therefore, his words and actions must be true.  Christ's proclamation at the Last Supper that the bread and wine were his body and blood must be taken literally, since God is truth.  He thus believes that the transubstantiation of the bread and wine offered in the Eucharist really occurs. Only if the Eucharist is the actual body and blood of Christ can a Christian know it is salvific.

Berengarius (999–1088) was the first dared to deny the Eucharistic conversion. More than once the Church threatened to condemn him unless he retracted. Thus pope Gregory VII, commanded him to swear to the following oath at the Roman Council VI in 1079: "I, Berengarius, in my heart believe and with my lips confess that through the mystery of the sacred prayer and the words of our Redeemer the bread and wine which are placed on the altar are substantially changed into the true and proper and living flesh and blood of Jesus Christ, our Lord…" (Denzinger [Dz] §355). In a discussion of the form of consecration (the word now used to refer to the blessing given by Jesus), Pope Innocent III states (1202) "For the species of bread and wine is perceived there, and the truth of the body and blood of Christ is believed and the power of unity and of love…. The form is of the bread and wine; the truth, of the flesh and blood..." Note that while the "realness" of this presence was defended, the purpose was not overlooked: to experience "the power of unity and of love," presumably in the body of Christians which was the Church. The dogma was affirmed repeatedly by the Catholic Church and within Catholic theology, e.g. at the Council of Lyon, 1274; by Pope Benedict XII, 1341; by Pope Clement VI, 1351; at the Council of Constance, 1418; at the Council of Florence, 1439; by Pope Julius III at the Council of Trent, 1551; by Pope Benedict XIV, 1743; by Pope Pius VI, 1794; and by Pope Leo XIII, 1887, inter alia. Other examples can be found to flesh out any interim.

The Summa Theologiae by Thomas Aquinas

The Summa Theologiae, c. 1270, is considered within the Catholic Church to be the paramount philosophical expression of its theology, and as such offers a clear discussion of the Eucharist. "[F]or Christ is Himself contained in the Eucharist sacramentally. Consequently, when Christ was going to leave His disciples in His proper species, He left Himself with them under the sacramental species..." "The presence of Christ's true body and blood in this sacrament cannot be detected by sense, nor understanding, but by faith alone, which rests upon Divine authority. Hence, on Luke 22:19: 'This is My body which shall be delivered up for you,' Cyril says: 'Doubt not whether this be true; but take rather the Saviour's words with faith; for since He is the Truth, He lieth not.' Now this is suitable, first for the perfection of the New Law. For, the sacrifices of the Old Law contained only in figure that true sacrifice of Christ's Passion, according to Hebrews 10:1: 'For the law having a shadow of the good things to come, not the very image of the things "[S]ince Christ's true body is in this sacrament, and since it does not begin to be there by local motion, nor is it contained therein as in a place, as is evident from what was stated above, it must be said then that it begins to be there by conversion of the substance of bread into itself." But, again, Thomas held that the final cause was the "cause of all causes" and so held priority over the material and formal causes (which had to do with substance) of which he was speaking. To be faithful to Thomas' theology, then, the purpose of the bread should never be overlooked in the effort to find meaning.

Faith  

In the gospel of John chapter six, Jesus emphasized the importance of faith for understanding his presence in the bread. The verb pisteuo ("believe") is used 98 times in this gospel. This points to the importance of faith for understanding what is asserted by Christians. St. Thomas quotes St. Cyril in emphasizing faith as a basis for understanding. St. Augustine writes, "I believe in order to understand, I understand the better to believe" Over time, the dogma was clarified and preserved, and presented consistently to catechumens. A contemporary explanation of Christ's presence would give a holistic explanation of its meaning: "The Baltimore Catechism portrayed a sacrament as 'an outward sign instituted by Christ to give grace.' In our perspective sacraments are symbols arising from the ministry of Christ and continued in and through the Church, which when received in faith, are encounters with God, Father, Son and Holy Spirit. In both definitions, four key elements can be identified: sign-symbol, relation to Christ, effectiveness or power, and what is effected, brought about or produced."

Other historical Eucharistic dogmas

Also a part of Church teaching are the need for a special minister for the celebration of the Eucharist; and the lasting presence of Christ in the bread and the respect that should be shown to the bread. St. Ignatius of Antioch, c.  110: "Let that be considered a valid Eucharist which is celebrated by the bishop, or by one whom he appoints". From St. Cyril of Alexandria, c. 440: "I hear that they are saying that the mystical blessing does not avail unto sanctification, if some of [the Eucharistic species] be left over to another day. They are utterly mad who say these things; for Christ is not made different, nor is His holy body changed, but the power of the blessing and the life-giving grace is uninterrupted in Him". And Tertullian, 211: "We take anxious care lest something of our Cup or Bread should fall upon the ground". Pope Innocent III, 1208: "[H]owever honest, religious, holy, and prudent anyone may be, he cannot nor ought he to consecrate the Eucharist nor to perform the sacrifice of the altar unless he be a priest, regularly ordained by a visible and perceptible bishop". The consecrated hosts are not merely changed permanently into Eucharist, but are due the worship of latria. In early counter-Reformation times, Pope Julius III wrote in 1551: "There is, therefore, no room left for doubt that all the faithful of Christ in accordance with a custom always received in the Catholic Church offer in veneration the worship of latria which is due to the true God, to this most Holy Sacrament".

Eucharistic adoration 
The Catholic Church approves private, devotional adoration of the Eucharistic Christ, individually or in groups, for a brief "visit to the Blessed Sacrament", a Holy Hour, the Forty Hours' Devotion or other Catholic devotions. The meaningfulness of this is evident from the number of churches that offer Exposition of the Blessed Sacrament on a regular basis. She also calls Catholics to keep in mind the greater value of the Mass for interpreting the full meaning of the Eucharist: "Popular devotions … should be so drawn up that they harmonize with the liturgical seasons, accord with the sacred liturgy, are in some fashion derived from it, and lead the people to it, since, in fact, the liturgy by its very nature far surpasses any of them."  

Historically, the communitarian and private fruits of the Eucharist have been held in dynamic tension: "The great themes of the liturgy (resurrection, hope, and God's love) should flow over into the family & private devotions of our daily lives and form a bridge leading back to the common assembly."

New Testament foundations

Sacred Tradition and Sacred Scripture make up a single sacred deposit of the Word of God' (Dei Verbum, 10) in which, as in a mirror, the pilgrim Church contemplates God, the source of all her riches."

The First Eucharist in Scripture
The Catholic Church sees as the main basis for this belief the words of Jesus himself at his Last Supper: the Synoptic Gospels (Matthew 26-28(NAB); Mark 14:22-24(NAB); Luke 22:19-20 (NAB) and Saint Paul's 1 Corinthians 11:23-25(NAB) recount that in that context Jesus said of what to all appearances were bread and wine: "This is my body ... this is my blood." The Catholic understanding of these words, from the Patristic authors onward, has emphasized their roots in the covenantal history of the Old Testament.

The Gospel of John in Chapter 6, The Discourse on the Bread of Life, presents Jesus as saying: "Unless you eat the flesh of the Son of Man and drink his blood, you do not have life within you... Whoever eats my flesh and drinks my blood remains in me and I in him". According to John, Jesus did not tone down these sayings, even when many of his disciples abandoned him, shocked at the idea.

Saint Paul implied an identity between the apparent bread and wine of the Eucharist and the body and blood of Christ, when he wrote: "The cup of blessing that we bless, is it not a participation in the blood of Christ?  The bread that we break, is it not a participation in the body of Christ?" and elsewhere: "Therefore whoever eats the bread or drinks the cup of the Lord unworthily will have to answer for the body and blood of the Lord"/

Moreover, and uniquely, in the one prayer given to posterity by Jesus, the Lord's Prayer, the word epiousios—which does not exist elsewhere in Classical Greek literature—has been linguistically parsed to mean "super-substantial" (bread), and interpreted by the Vatican as a reference to the Bread of Life, the Eucharist.

Other New Testament accounts of the Eucharist
Accounts of Eucharist services in the New Testament are often, though not always, denoted by the phrase "the Breaking of Bread." The first example, after the Last Supper, of this phrase used in a way that recalls a Eucharist celebration occurs when, in the Gospel of Luke, the resurrected Christ walked with two disciples on their way to Emmaus (see: Road to Emmaus appearance). The disciples were unable to recognize him for who he was until "while he was at table, he took bread, said the blessing, broke it, and gave it to them.  With that their eyes were opened and they recognized him." After this they returned to Jerusalem, where "the two recounted what had taken place on the way and how he was made known to them in the breaking of the bread."  This same phrase is used to describe a core activity of the first Christian community: "They devoted themselves to the teaching of the apostles and to the communal life, to the breaking of the bread and to prayers... every day they devoted themselves to meeting together in the temple area and to breaking bread in their homes".

Other New Testament references to the Eucharist include:

 the Eucharist being the re-presentation of Jesus' Sacrifice, and a sign of hope for his return (1 Cor 11:26)
 respect due to the real presence of Christ in the Eucharist (1 Cor 11:27)
deeper meaning and purpose represented by the bread (Col 1:18-20, 26-28; 3:11,15; Eph 4:4, 12, 16).

Old Testament prefigurings
Early medieval block-printed Catholic prayer books or psalters contained many illustrations of pairings of prefigurings of the events of the New Testament in the Old Testament, a form known as biblical typology. In an age when most Christians were illiterate, these visual depictions came to be known as biblia pauperum, or poor man's bibles. The Bible itself was predominantly a liturgical book used at Mass, costly to produce and illuminate by hand. The custom of praying the Liturgy of the Hours spread to those who could afford the prayer books required to follow the textual cycle that mirrored the pastoral seasons of Jewish temple worship.

Saint Thomas Aquinas taught that the most obvious Old Testament prefiguring of the sign aspect of the Eucharist was the action of Melchizedek in Genesis 14:18, that all the Old Testament sacrifices, especially that of the Day of Atonement, prefigured the content of the sacrament, namely Christ himself sacrificed for us, and that the manna was a special prefiguration of the effect of the sacrament as grace; but he said that the paschal lamb was the outstanding type or figure of the Eucharist under all three aspects of sign, content and effect.

Concerning the first of the Old Testament prefigurations that Aquinas mentioned, Melchizedek's action in bringing out bread and wine for Abraham has been seen, from the time of Clement of Alexandria (c.150 - c. 215), as a foreshadowing of the bread and wine used in the sacrament of the Eucharist, and so "the Church sees in the gesture of the king-priest Melchizedek, who 'brought out bread and wine', a prefiguring of her own offering" (in the Eucharist).

The second prefiguration mentioned by Aquinas is that of the Old Testament sacrifices, especially that on the Day of Atonement. Other theologians too see these as foreshadowing the Eucharist. They point out that Jesus "himself said, as he committed to the Apostles the Divine Eucharist during the Last Supper, 'This is my blood of the New Testament, which is shed for many for the remission of sins'."

The manna that fed the Israelites in the wilderness is also seen as a symbol of the Eucharist. The connection between that sign and the Eucharist is seen as having been made both in John 6 and also in the version of the Lord's Prayer in the Gospel of Luke: where the version in the Gospel of Matthew speaks of epiousios bread, the Lucan version speaks of "bread for each day", interpreted as a reminiscence of Exodus 16:19-21, which recounts that the manna was gathered in amounts sufficient only for a single day. Saint Ambrose saw the Eucharist prefigured both by the manna that provided food and by the water from the rock that gave drink to the Israelites.

The ritual of Passover night described in Exodus contains two main physical elements:  a sacrificial lamb  "male and without blemish" and unleavened bread.  In addition to this ritual for Passover night itself, Exodus prescribed a "perpetual institution" associated with the Passover that is celebrated by feasts of unleavened bread. The New Testament book of 1 Corinthians represents the Passover in terms of Christ:  "… For our paschal lamb, Christ, has been sacrificed.  Therefore let us celebrate the feast, not with the old yeast, the yeast of malice and wickedness, but with the unleavened bread of sincerity and truth."  Christ is the new lamb, and the Eucharist is the new bread of the Passover.

Among the many proscription of the Old Testament Law that affirm the covenant, one stands out, being called "most sacred among the various oblations to the Lord " :  a sacrifice of bread anointed with oil.  "Regularly on each Sabbath day this bread shall be set out afresh before the Lord, offered on the part of the Israelites by an everlasting agreement." Since the time of Origen, some theologians have seen this "showbread" as a prefiguring of the Eucharist described in Luke 22:19.

Eucharist in the Mass

Sacrifice 

According to the Compendium of the Catechism of the Catholic Church "The Eucharist is the very sacrifice of the Body and Blood of the Lord Jesus which he instituted to perpetuate the sacrifice of the cross throughout the ages until his return in glory. Thus he entrusted to his Church this memorial of his death and Resurrection. It is a sign of unity, a bond of charity, a paschal banquet, in which Christ is consumed, the mind is filled with grace, and a pledge of future glory is given to us."

The consecration of the bread (known afterwards as the Host) and wine represents the memorial of Christ's Passover, the making present and the sacramental offering of his unique sacrifice, in the liturgy of the Church which is his Body... the memorial is not merely the recollection of past events but ... they become in a certain way present and real. When the Church celebrates the Eucharist, she commemorates Christ's Passover, and it is made present the sacrifice Christ offered once for all on the cross remains ever present. The Eucharist is thus a sacrifice because it re-presents (makes present) the same and only sacrifice of the cross, because it is its memorial and because it applies its fruit.

The sacrifice of Christ and the sacrifice of the Eucharist are one single sacrifice: "The victim is one and the same: the same now offers through the ministry of priests, who then offered himself on the cross; only the manner of offering is different." "And since in this divine sacrifice which is celebrated in the Mass, the same Christ who offered himself once in a bloody manner on the altar of the cross is contained and is offered in an unbloody manner. . . this sacrifice is truly propitiatory."

However, as modern historical and Biblical studies have shown, using the word "propitiation", while it was St. Jerome's translation of the Vulgate, is misleading for describing the sacrifice of Jesus and its Eucharistic remembrance. One expression of the conclusion of theologians is that sacrifice "is not something human beings do to God (that would be propitiation) but something which God does for human kind (which is expiation)."

The only ministers who can officiate at the Eucharist and consecrate the sacrament are validly ordained priests (either bishops or presbyters) acting in the person of Christ ("in persona Christi"). In other words, the priest celebrant represents Christ, who is the Head of the Church, and acts before God the Father in the name of the Church, always using "we" not "I" during the Eucharistic prayer. The matter used must be wheaten bread and grape wine; this is considered essential for validity.

Transubstantiation 

The term Eucharist is also used for the bread and wine when transubstantiated (their substance having been changed), according to Catholic teaching, into the body and blood of Jesus Christ. According to the Catholic Church, when the bread and wine are consecrated by the priest at Mass, they cease to be bread and wine, and become instead the Body and Blood of Christ by the power of the Holy Spirit and by the words of Christ. The empirical appearances and attributes are not changed, but the underlying reality is.

However, since according to Catholic dogma Christ has risen, the Church teaches that his body and blood are no longer truly separated, even if the appearances of the bread and the wine are. Where one is, the other must be. This is called the doctrine of concomitance. Therefore, although the priest (or minister) says, "The body of Christ", when administering the host, and, "The blood of Christ", when presenting the chalice, the communicant who receives either one receives Christ, whole and entire— "Body, Blood, Soul, and Divinity".

The Catechism of the Catholic Church says about it: "Christ is present whole and entire in each of the species and whole and entire in each of their parts, in such a way that the breaking of the bread does not divide Christ."

Transubstantiation (from Latin transsubstantiatio) is the change of the substance of bread and wine into that of the body and blood of Christ, the change that, according to the belief of the Catholic Church, occurs during the consecration by the power of the Holy Spirit and by the words of Christ. It concerns what is changed (the substance of the bread and wine), not how the change is brought about.

"Substance" here means what something is in itself. (For more on the philosophical concept, see Substance theory.) A hat's shape is not the hat itself, nor is its colour the hat, nor is its size, nor its softness to the touch, nor anything else about it perceptible to the senses. The hat itself (what we call the "substance") has the shape, the colour, the size, the softness and the other appearances, but is distinct from them. The things the senses perceive we call "appearances" or "accidents" and, "as the senses make no contact with the thing itelf, they would be totally unaffected by a change in it, unless that changed  affected the appearances[…] We believe on God's word that this happens in the Blessed Eucharist: the substance of the bread is changed into the substance of Christ's body (hence the word transubstantiation): the appearances of bread remain."

When at his Last Supper Jesus said: "This is my body", what he held in his hands had all the appearances of bread. However, the Catholic Church teaches that the underlying reality was changed in accordance with what Jesus said, that the "substance" of the bread was converted to that of his body. In other words, it actually was his body, while all the appearances open to the senses or to scientific investigation were still those of bread, exactly as before. Science has no direct dealing with substance, but only with appearances – and in these, by the very terms of the dogma, there is no change. The Church believes that the same change of the substance of the bread and of the wine occurs at every Catholic Mass throughout the world.

The Catholic Church accordingly believes that through transubstantiation Christ is really, truly and substantially present under the appearances of bread and wine, and that the transformation remains as long as the appearances remain. For this reason the consecrated elements are preserved, generally in a church tabernacle, for giving Holy Communion to the sick and dying, and also for the secondary, but still highly lauded, purpose of adoring Christ present in the Eucharist.

In "the most blessed sacrament" of the Eucharist "the body and blood, together with the soul and divinity, of Jesus Christ and, therefore, the whole Christ is truly, really, and substantially contained." "This presence is called 'real' – by which is not intended to exclude the other types of presence as if they could not be 'real' too, but because it is presence in the fullest sense: that is to say, it is a substantial presence by which Christ, God and man, makes himself wholly and entirely present."

There is more to the real presence of Christ in the Eucharist than the fact of transubstantiation. The Eucharist was instituted, as Jesus said, "for you", "for the forgiveness of sins" and, as Saint Paul taught, to form worshippers into one body in Christ. John Zupez says: "From the start there was no separation of the fact of the real presence in the bread and the reason for this presence. But the term transubstantiation focuses only on the fact."

The doctrine of the change of the reality, called the "substance", is not dependent on Aristotelian philosophy: the earliest known use of the term "transubstantiation" to describe the change from bread and wine to body and blood of Christ was by Hildebert de Lavardin, Archbishop of Tours (died 1133) in about 1079, long before the Latin West, under the influence especially of Saint Thomas Aquinas (c. 1227-1274), accepted Aristotelianism. (The University of Paris was founded only between 1150 and 1170.) The term "substance" (substantia) as the reality of something was in use from the earliest centuries of Latin Christianity, as when they spoke of the Son as being of the same "substance" (consubstantialis) as the Father. The corresponding Greek term is "οὐσία" the Son is said to be "ὁμοούσιος" with the Father and the change of the bread and wine into the body and blood of Christ is called "μετουσίωσις". The doctrine of transubstantiation is thus independent of Aristotelian philosophical concepts, and these were not and are not dogmata of the Church.

Minister of the sacrament 

The only minister of the Eucharist (someone who can consecrate the Eucharist) is a validly ordained priest (bishop or presbyter). He acts in the person of Christ, representing Christ, who is the Head of the Church, and also acts before God in the name of the Church. Several priests may concelebrate the same offering of the Eucharist.

Latin Church practice
Within the Latin Church, those who are not ordained clergy may act as extraordinary Ministers of Holy Communion, distributing the sacrament to others.

"Extraordinary ministers of Holy Communion" are not to be called "special minister of Holy Communion" nor "extraordinary minister of the Eucharist" nor "special minister of the Eucharist", by which names the meaning of this function is unnecessarily and improperly broadened, since that would imply that they, too, somehow transubstantiate the bread and wine into the Body and Blood of Christ.

"Extraordinary ministers may distribute Holy Communion at eucharistic celebrations only when there are no ordained ministers present or when those ordained ministers present at a liturgical celebration are truly unable to distribute Holy Communion. They may also exercise this function at eucharistic celebrations where there are particularly large numbers of the faithful and which would be excessively prolonged because of an insufficient number of ordained ministers to distribute Holy Communion." "Only when there is a necessity may extraordinary ministers assist the Priest celebrant in accordance with the norm of law."

During the administration of the Eucharist, the celebrant and the believers are used to perform a liturgical chant, with a possible instrumental arccompaniement. Among its oldest and most solemn eucharistic liturgical forms, the Latin Church annoverates the following Latin hymns: Adoro te devote, Ave verum corpus, Lauda Sion Salvatorem, Pange lingua, O sacrum convivium, O salutaris Hostia, Panis Angelicus.

Receiving the Eucharist

The Eucharist is celebrated daily during the celebration of Mass, the eucharistic liturgy (except on Good Friday, when consecration takes place on Holy Thursday, but is distributed during the Solemn Afternoon Liturgy of the Passion and Death of the Lord, and Holy Saturday, when Mass may not be celebrated and the Eucharist may only be distributed as Viaticum). 

According to the Catholic Church doctrine receiving the Eucharist in a state of mortal sin is a sacrilege and only those who are in a state of sanctifying grace - the absence of mortal sin (which deprives one of sanctifying grace) - can receive it. Based on 1 Corinthians 11:27-29, it affirms the following: "Anyone who is aware of having committed a mortal sin must not receive Holy Communion, even if he experiences deep contrition, without having first received sacramental absolution, unless he has a grave reason for receiving Communion and there is no possibility of going to confession."

The principal fruit of receiving the Eucharist in Holy Communion is an intimate union with Christ Jesus. Indeed, the Lord said: "He who eats my flesh and drinks my blood abides in me, and I in him."

Catholics must receive the Eucharist at least once a year - if possible, during Eastertide - but for grave reason (such as illness or child rearing) or dispensation are excused from attending Mass. 

A rule for Catholics who are members of the Latin Church is: "A person who is to receive the Most Holy Eucharist is to abstain for at least one hour before holy communion from any food and drink, except for only water and medicine." Eastern Catholics are obliged to follow the rules of their own particular Churches, which generally require a longer period of fasting.

Catholics must make an outward sign of reverence before receiving. "When receiving Holy Communion, the communicant bows his or her head before the Sacrament as a gesture of reverence and receives the Body of the Lord from the minister. The consecrated host may be received either on the tongue or in the hand, at the discretion of each communicant. When Holy Communion is received under both kinds, the sign of reverence is also made before receiving the Precious Blood."

Catholics may receive Communion during Mass or outside Mass, but "a person who has already received the Most Holy Eucharist can receive it a second time on the same day only within the eucharistic celebration in which the person participates", except as Viaticum (Code of Canon Law, canon 917).

In the Western Church, "the administration of the Most Holy Eucharist to children requires that they have sufficient knowledge and careful preparation so that they understand the mystery of Christ according to their capacity and are able to receive the body of Christ with faith and devotion. The Most Holy Eucharist, however, can be administered to children in danger of death if they can distinguish the body of Christ from ordinary food and receive communion reverently" (Code of Canon Law, canon 913). In Catholic schools in the United States and Canada, children typically receive First Communion in second grade. In the Eastern Catholic Churches, the Eucharist is administered to infants immediately after Baptism and Confirmation (Chrismation).

Holy Communion may be received under one kind (the Sacred Host or the Precious Blood alone), or under both kinds (both the Sacred Host and the Precious Blood). "Holy Communion has a fuller form as a sign when it is distributed under both kinds. For in this form the sign of the eucharistic banquet is more clearly evident and clear expression is given to the divine will by which the new and eternal Covenant is ratified in the Blood of the Lord, as also the relationship between the Eucharistic banquet and the eschatological banquet in the Father's Kingdom... (However,) Christ, whole and entire, and the true Sacrament, is received even under only one species, and consequently that as far as the effects are concerned, those who receive under only one species are not deprived of any of the grace that is necessary for salvation" (General Instruction of the Roman Missal).

"The Diocesan Bishop is given the faculty to permit Communion under both kinds whenever it may seem appropriate to the priest to whom, as its own shepherd, a community has been entrusted, provided that the faithful have been well instructed and there is no danger of profanation of the Sacrament or of the rite's becoming difficult because of the large number of participants or some other reason" (General Instruction of the Roman Missal).

The General Instruction of the Roman Missal mentions a "Communion-plate for the Communion of the faithful", distinct from the paten, and speaks of its use in relation to the administration of Communion by intinction, in which receiving Communion directly in the mouth is obligatory. The Instruction Redemptionis sacramentum states: "The Communion-plate for the Communion of the faithful should be retained, so as to avoid the danger of the sacred host or some fragment of it falling."

Communicatio in Sacris

Validly baptized non-Catholics may receive the Eucharist from Catholic ministers only in special situations:

Fruits
The principal fruits of receiving the Eucharist in Holy Communion is an intimate union with Christ Jesus; preserves, increases, and renews the life of grace received at Baptism; separates from sin; strengthens charity, which tends to be weakened in daily life; preserves from future mortal sins and unites to all the faithful in one body - the Church.

Matter for the Sacrament
The bread used for the Eucharist must be wheaten only, and recently made, and the wine must be natural, made from grapes, and not corrupt. The bread is unleavened in the Latin, Armenian and Ethiopic Rites, but is leavened in most Eastern Catholic churches. A small quantity of water is added to the wine.

The Congregation for Divine Worship provided guidance on the character of bread and wine to be used by Catholics in a letter to bishops dated 15 June 2017. It included instructions concerning gluten-free or low-gluten bread and non-alcoholic substitutes for wine.

Historical development

Whether the agape feast, a full meal held by Christians in the first centuries, was in all cases associated with a celebration of the Eucharist is uncertain. In any case, abuses connected with the celebration of the full meal, abuses denounced by the apostles Paul and Jude, led to a distinct celebration of the Eucharist. The form of this celebration in the middle of the second century is described by Justin Martyr as very similar to today's Eucharistic rites known in the West as the Mass and in much of the East as the Divine Liturgy. The regular celebration was held each week on the day called Sunday, which Christians were also calling the Lord's Day. They included readings from Scripture, a homily, prayer by all, a prayer by "the president of the brethren" over bread and wine mixed with water, to which all respond with "Amen", and then a distribution to those present of that over which thanks have been given, while "deacons" take portions to those who are absent. There was also a collection to help widows and orphans and those in need because of reasons such as sickness. Justin wrote that the Christians did not receive the bread and the wine mixed with water over which the thanksgiving was pronounced and which they called Εὐχαριστία (the Eucharist - literally, Thanksgiving), as common bread and common drink, having been taught that "the food which is blessed by the prayer of His word, and from which our blood and flesh by transmutation are nourished, is the flesh and blood of that Jesus who was made flesh."

As Justin indicated, the word Eucharist is from the Greek word εὐχαριστία (eucharistia), which means thanksgiving. Catholics typically restrict the term 'communion' to the reception of the Body and Blood of Christ by the communicants during the celebration of the Mass and to the communion of saints.

Earlier still, in about 106, Saint Ignatius of Antioch criticized those who "abstain from the Eucharist and the public prayer, because they will not admit that the Eucharist is the self-same Body of our Savior Jesus Christ, which [flesh] suffered for our sins, and which the Father in His goodness raised up again" (Epistle to the Smyrnaeans 6, 7). Similarly, St. Ambrose of Milan countered objections to the doctrine, writing "You may perhaps say: 'My bread is ordinary.' But that bread is bread before the words of the Sacraments; where the consecration has entered in, the bread becomes the Flesh of Christ" (The Sacraments, 333/339-397 A.D. v.2,1339,1340).

The earliest known use, in about 1079, of the term "transubstantiation" to describe the change from bread and wine to body and blood of Christ was by Hildebert de Savardin, Archbishop of Tours (died 1133). He did this in response to Berengar of Tours declaring that the Eucharist was only symbolic. This was long before the Latin West, under the influence especially of Saint Thomas Aquinas (c. 1227-1274), accepted Aristotelianism. (The University of Paris was founded only between 1150 and 1170.)

In 1215, the Fourth Lateran Council used the word transubstantiated in its profession of faith, when speaking of the change that takes place in the Eucharist.

In 1551 the Council of Trent officially defined that "by the consecration of the bread and of the wine, a conversion is made of the whole substance of the bread into the substance of the body of Christ our Lord, and of the whole substance of the wine into the substance of His blood; which conversion is, by the holy Catholic Church, suitably and properly called Transubstantiation."

The attempt by some twentieth-century Catholic theologians to present the Eucharistic change as an alteration of significance (transignification rather than transubstantiation) was rejected by Pope Paul VI in his 1965 encyclical letter. In his 1968 Credo of the People of God, he reiterated that any theological explanation of the doctrine must hold to the twofold claim that, after the consecration, 1) Christ's body and blood are really present; and 2) bread and wine are really absent; and this presence and absence is real and not merely something in the mind of the believer.

In his encyclical Ecclesia de Eucharistia of 17 April 2003, Pope John Paul II taught that all authority of bishops and priests is primarily a function of their vocation to celebrate the Eucharist. Their governing authority flows from their priestly function, not the other way around.

Communion of reparation

Receiving Holy Communion as part of the first Fridays devotion is a Catholic devotion to offer reparations for sins through the Sacred Heart of Jesus. In the visions of Christ reported by Saint Margaret Mary Alacoque in the 17th century, several promises were made to those people that practiced the first Fridays devotion, one of which included final perseverance.

The devotion consists of several practices that are performed on each first Friday of nine consecutive months. On these days, a person is to attend Holy Mass and receive Communion. In many Catholic communities the practice of the Holy Hour of meditation during the exposition of the Blessed Sacrament during the First Fridays is encouraged.

Adoration of reparation

Practicing Eucharistic adoration before the tabernacle (especially made in front of the most forgotten and abandoned tabernacles) as part of the first Thursdays devotion is a Catholic devotion to offer reparation for the Holy Wounds of Christ. In the visions of Christ reported by Blessed Alexandrina of Balazar in the 20th century, several promises were made by Jesus to those who practice the first Thursdays devotion, one of which included the salvation of the soul at the moment of death.

The devotion consists of several practices that are performed on the first Thursdays of six consecutive months. The number six represents Jesus five wounds of the Crucifixion (hands, feet, and side) plus His shoulder wound from carrying the Holy Cross. On these days, a person is to attend the Holy Mass and receive the Holy Communion in a state of grace "with sincere humility, fervor and love" and spend one hour before a Church tabernacle containing the Blessed Sacrament, meditating on the wounds of Jesus (particularly His often-overlooked shoulder wound which He received from carrying the Cross) and the sorrows of Mary.

Nuptial Mass and other Ritual Masses

A Nuptial Mass is simply a Mass within which the sacrament of Marriage is celebrated. Other sacraments too are celebrated within Mass. This is necessarily so for the sacrament of Orders, and is normal, though not obligatory, for the Sacrament of Confirmation, as well as that of Marriage. Unless the date chosen is that of a major liturgical feast, the prayers are taken from the section of the Roman Missal headed "Ritual Masses". This section has special texts for the celebration, within Mass, of Baptism, Confirmation, Anointing of the Sick, Orders, and Marriage, leaving Confession (Penance or Reconciliation) as the only sacrament not celebrated within a celebration of the Eucharist. There are also texts for celebrating, within Mass, Religious Profession, the Dedication of a Church and several other rites.

If, of a couple being married in the Catholic Church, one is not a Catholic, the rite of Marriage outside Mass is to be followed. However, if the non-Catholic has been baptized in the name of all three persons of the Trinity (and not only in the name of, say, Jesus, as is the baptismal practice in some branches of Christianity), then, in exceptional cases and provided the bishop of the diocese gives permission, it may be considered suitable to celebrate the Marriage within Mass, except that, according to the general law, Communion is not given to the non-Catholic (Rite of Marriage, 8).

Adoration and Benediction outside of the Liturgy

Exposition of the Eucharist is the display of the consecrated host on an altar in a Monstrance. The rites involving exposition of the Blessed Sacrament are the Benediction of the Blessed Sacrament and Eucharistic adoration.

Adoration of the Eucharist is a sign of devotion to and worship of Christ, who is believed to be truly present. The host is generally reserved in the tabernacle after Mass and displayed in a monstrance during adoration. As a Catholic devotion, Eucharistic adoration and meditation are more than merely looking at the host, but a continuation of what was celebrated in the Eucharist. From a theological perspective, the adoration is a form of latria, based on the tenet of the presence of Christ in the Blessed Host.

Christian meditation performed in the presence of the Eucharist outside Mass is called Eucharistic meditation. It has been practiced by saints such as Peter Julian Eymard, Jean Vianney and Thérèse of Lisieux. Authors such as the Venerable Concepcion Cabrera de Armida and Blessed Maria Candida of the Eucharist have produced large volumes of text based on their Eucharistic meditations.

When the exposure and adoration of the Eucharist is constant (twenty-four hours a day), it is called Perpetual adoration. in a monastery or convent, it is done by the resident monks or nuns and in a parish, by volunteer parishioners since the 20th century. On June 2, 1991 (feast of Corpus Christi), the Pontifical Council for the Laity issued specific guidelines that permit perpetual adoration in parishes. In order to establish a "perpetual adoration chapel" in a parish, the local priest must obtain permission from his Bishop by submitting a request along with the required information for the local "perpetual adoration association", its officers, etc.

Since the Middle Ages the practice of Eucharistic adoration outside Mass has been encouraged by the popes. In Ecclesia de Eucharistia Pope John Paul II stated that "The worship of the Eucharist outside the Mass is of inestimable value for the life of the Church.... It is the responsibility of Pastors to encourage, also by their personal witness, the practice of Eucharistic adoration, and exposition of the Blessed Sacrament. In the opening prayer of the Perpetual chapel in St. Peter Basilica Pope John Paul II prayed for a perpetual adoration chapel in every parish in the world. Pope Benedict XVI instituted perpetual adoration for the laity in each of the five districts of the Diocese of Rome.

See also

 Bread of Life Discourse
 Canon 844
 Canon 915
 Directory for Masses with Children
 Eucharistic credo
 Eucharistic miracle
Jesus in comparative mythology
 Paschal mystery
 Communion as perichoresis
 Sacraments of Initiation

References

Notes

Bibliography
The Saint Andrew Daily Missal, St. Bonaventure Publications, Inc., 1999 reprint ed.
Father Gabriel, Divine Intimacy, Tan Books and Publishers, Inc., 1996 reprint ed.
William A. Jurgens, The Faith of the Early Fathers.
Alfred McBride, O.Praem., Celebrating the Mass, Our Sunday Visitor, 1999.
Very Rev. J. Tissot, The Interior Life, 1916, pp. 347–9.

Works cited

Further reading

 The Council of Trent on the Eucharist

 Laferrière, P. M. New & Eternal Testament [i.e. the Holy Eucharist]. Trans. by Roger Capel, with a Foreword by C. C. Martindale. London: Harvill Press, 1961. N.B.: The French text, of the rev. ed. of this work, had been published in 1958.

External links

http://www.savior.org/ - Live Video Stream of the Eucharist

Ancient texts and modern studies on the eucharist in Tiresias: The Ancient Mediterranean Religions Source Database.